Nelson Sing (born 10 April 1995) is Timorese football player. He is the third youngest player to make his debut with the Timor-Leste national football team at the age of 15 years 225 days, youngest debutant record currently held by Adelino Trindade who made his debut at the age of 15 years 172 days.

International career
Sing made his senior international debut in the friendly match against Indonesia national football team on 21 November 2010 when he was aged 15 years 225 days.

References

External links
 

1995 births
Living people
East Timorese footballers
East Timorese people of Chinese descent
Timor-Leste international footballers
Association football midfielders